Carolyn Anne Muessig holds the Chair of Christian Studies at the University of Calgary. A graduate of Fulton-Montgomery Community College, State University of New York at Buffalo, the University of Toronto, the Pontifical Institute of Mediaeval Studies, and the Université de Montréal, Muessig is a specialist in the history of medieval preaching, Jacques de Vitry, Francis of Assisi, Catherine of Siena and female educators of the Middle Ages. Prior to moving to Calgary, she was Professor of Medieval Studies at the University of Bristol. She was co-editor (with Veronica O'Mara) of Medieval Sermon Studies for 17 years and since 2001 she has been series co-editor with George Ferzoco of Routledge Studies in Medieval Religion and Culture.

Selected publications

Books and edited volumes 

 Medieval Monastic Preaching. Brill's Studies in Intellectual History, 90. Leiden, Boston, Köln: Brill, 1998. ; ISSN 0920-8607.
 The Faces of Women in the Sermons of Jacques de Vitry. Peregrina Translation Series. Toronto: Peregrina, 1999. ; ; ISSN 0832-7092.
 Preacher, Sermon and Audience in the Middle Ages. A New History of the Sermon, 3. Leiden and Boston: Brill, 2002. ; ; ISSN 2590-230X.
 Medieval Monastic Education, edited with George Ferzoco. London and New York: Leicester University Press, 2000  hardback;   e-book; New York and London: Continuum, 2005 (Continuum Studies in Medieval History) ; .
 Envisaging Heaven in the Middle Ages, edited with Ad Putter. Routledge Studies in Medieval Religion and Culture, 6. London and New York: Routledge, 2007.  (hardback);  (e-book); ; 
 A Companion to Catherine of Siena, edited with George Ferzoco and Beverly Mayne Kienzle. Brill's Companions to the Christian Tradition (ISSN 1871-6377) v. 32. Leiden and Boston: Brill, 2011. xvi, 395 p. : ill. ;  (hardback);  (hardback)
 The Stigmata in Medieval and Early Modern Europe. Oxford: Oxford University Press, 2020.

Articles and chapters 

 'Can't Take My Eyes Off Of You': Mutual Gazing Between the Divine and Humanity in Late Medieval Preaching', Optics, Ethics, and Art in the Thirteenth and Fourteenth Centuries, ed. by Herbert L. Kessler and Richard G. Newhauser (Toronto: Pontifical Institute of Mediaeval Studies, 2018 ) 17-28
 'Medieval Reportationes: Hearing and Listening to Sermons', L’Éloquence de la chair entre écriture et oralité, ed. by Gabriel Aubert, Cinthia Meli, and Amy Heneveld (Paris: Honoré Champion, 2018 77–90.

References

External links 

 'A Perfect Miracle: The Stigmata in Pre-modern Europe', Professorial Inaugural Lecture, University of Bristol (16 March 2016). http://www.bristol.ac.uk/pace/public-events/inaugural/2016/muessig.html/
 'Performance and Female Preaching in Late Medieval and Early Modern Europe', annual lecture, Oxford Medieval Studies Programme (12 June 2018). https://www.youtube.com/watch?v=ZEHJgcMXJpE

Living people
Year of birth missing (living people)
Academics of the University of Bristol
University of Toronto alumni
Université de Montréal alumni
British historians of religion
Women's historians